The Officer and the Lady is a 1941 American crime film directed by Sam White and written by Lambert Hillyer and Joseph Hoffman. The film stars Rochelle Hudson, Bruce Bennett, Roger Pryor, Richard Fiske, Sidney Blackmer and Tom Kennedy. The film was released on October 12, 1941, by Columbia Pictures.

Plot

Cast          
Rochelle Hudson as Helen Regan
Bruce Bennett as Bob Conlon
Roger Pryor as Johnny Davis
Richard Fiske as Ace Quinn
Sidney Blackmer as Blake Standish
Tom Kennedy as Bumps O'Neil
Oscar O'Shea as Dan Regan
Joe McGuinn as Frank
Charles C. Wilson as Police Captain Hart
William Hall as Dawson

References

External links
 

1941 films
American black-and-white films
American crime films
1941 crime films
Columbia Pictures films
Films directed by Sam White (film producer)
1940s English-language films
1940s American films
English-language crime films